Fiona Armstrong, Lady MacGregor (born 28 November 1956), is a British television journalist and is Lord Lieutenant of Dumfries. She is also the author of several books and has written for newspapers and made television programmes on Scottish topics including fishing and Scottish clans.

Early life
Armstrong was born in Preston, Lancashire. As a child she lived for ten years in Nigeria, where her father was in the colonial service. She became Lady MacGregor of MacGregor when she married clan chief Sir Malcolm Gregor Charles MacGregor, 7th Baronet (born 1959) in 2005. She has a daughter, Natasha (born 1992), from her first marriage to Rodney Potts.

She studied German Literature at University College, London; at university, she edited the London Student newspaper.

Career
She started her career in local radio, before joining the BBC news team in Manchester in 1983. She then moved to Border Television as a news reporter, before becoming a regular newsreader and presenter for the nightly regional news programme Lookaround. In March 1987, she switched to ITN as a reporter/newscaster on News at Ten, News at 5:45 (later News at 5:40) and other bulletins. On the reporting side, she covered the Lockerbie air disaster and produced a series on AIDS orphans in Africa. In 1993, she was one of the launch team on the ITV breakfast station GMTV, but left after only a few months.

She presented the breakfast news programme on BBC World, before rejoining ITV Border as a presenter of Lookaround, as well as a presenter and producer on a number of regional programmes for the station, including "Eagle's Eye" and Fiona on Fishing. She has fronted antiques, political, cooking and lifestyle programmes for the ITV regions. As one of the UK's best known female anglers, she has written two fishing books and made fishing films for Sky TV's 'Tight Lines' programme. Her series, River Journeys, was shown on the Discovery Channel.

In February 2009, ITV Tyne Tees & Border was launched, replacing ITV Tyne Tees and ITV Border. Armstrong was announced as Features Correspondent for the service on a freelance basis. Her work took her to Cambodia to report on the work of land mine  charities and to West Africa to cover the work of the Mercy Ships. Armstrong returned to network television news on 15 February 2010 as a presenter for the BBC News Channel. She went on to present Border Life, a current affairs programme for ITV Border. Whilst working as a journalist for the BBC News Channel, Armstrong interviewed the civil rights activist and writer, Darcus Howe, on the subject of the street disturbances in England in the summer of 2011. During the interview on 9 August 2011, studio-based Armstrong asserted: "You are not a stranger to riots yourself I understand, are you? You have taken part in them yourself." Howe denied that he had ever taken part in riots and was clearly offended. The BBC later issued a qualified apology to Darcus Howe for Armstrong's accusation.

Armstrong specialises in Scottish clan history. She has made more than 20 films on Scottish families, and in 2006, set up the first Border Reiver Trail in the south of Scotland. She is a columnist for magazines and newspapers, including Scottish Field magazine, the "Courier" newspaper, and the American-based Scotbanner newspaper.

She is on the board of the University of Central Lancashire as well as being a fellow there. She is Chairman of the Clan Armstrong Trust and a judge of Cumbria Book of the Year. She is also patron of the 'Bookmark' book festival and a deputy lieutenant of Dumfriesshire.  She is currently writing a book on Queen Victoria and a family connection to Scotland.

Her appointment as Lord Lieutenant of Dumfries was announced on 26 January 2016.

References

External links

1956 births
Alumni of University College London
BBC newsreaders and journalists
British reporters and correspondents
British student newspaper editors
British television presenters
British television journalists
GMTV presenters and reporters
ITV regional newsreaders and journalists
Living people
Lord-Lieutenants of Dumfries
Wives of baronets
English people of Scottish descent
Mass media people from Preston, Lancashire
British women journalists
British radio presenters
British women radio presenters
British women television presenters